Peter Gregory (born 25 July 1992) is an English footballer who last played for Whitehawk. He is a full back capable of playing on either flank, he can also play as a winger.

Club career

Early career
Born in Eastbourne, Gregory started his footballing career at Brighton's youth setup before moving to Portsmouth Academy; after being offered a scholarship deal with the latter in June 2008, he was a regular first choice in the Premiership Reserve League. He won man of the match awards in FA Youth Cup twice, whilst being also first-choice left back with the under-16s and first-choice right back with the under-18s.

Portsmouth
Gregory signed a one-year professional deal with Portsmouth on 1 July 2010, being assigned number 39. He played in pre-season matches against Fulham and Bournemouth, and was also taken on the club's North American Tour playing against Club América, D.C. United, FC Edmonton and Ventura County Fusion.

Gregory made his first-team debut on 7 August, replacing John Utaka in the 83rd minute of a 0–2 Championship away loss against Coventry City. He appeared in further twelve minutes in a 2–1 away success against Stevenage in the Football League Cup two days later, and featured on the bench in a 1–1 home draw against Reading on 14 August.

Gregory made no further appearances for Pompey during the campaign, and was released along with nine players on 15 May 2011.

Eastbourne/Lewes
On 15 November, Gregory signed a contract with Eastbourne Borough. However, after being sparingly used, he joined Lewes in March 2012.

Gregory played in ten matches for the Rooks during the season, all as a starter.

Nottingham Forest
On 27 September Gregory left Lewes and joined Nottingham Forest. After playing regularly with the U21s, he was released in May of the following year.

Trial periods
Shortly after being released, Gregory moved abroad for the first time in his career, joining Hansa Rostock in a trial basis. In January of the following year he was selected for the North American Soccer League Combine at the University of California, after training for a couple of days with Chivas USA in October.

Ventura County Fusion
In May 2014 Gregory joined Premier Development League side Ventura County Fusion. He made his debut for the club on 8 May, and scored the winning goal in their first round US Open Cup game, a 2–1 win over CD Aguiluchos.

Beira-Mar
On 12 July 2014 Gregory switched teams and countries again, signing a one-year deal with S.C. Beira-Mar. He made his debut for the club on 17 August, replacing Bilal Sebaihi in the 78th minute of a 0–1 away loss against Oriental in the Segunda Liga. On 11 December 2014, Gregory announced on his official site that he had left the club.

Return to America
In 2018, Gregory returned to America to sign for National Premier Soccer League side Orange County and he continued to play for the club in the 2019 season too.

Return to Lewes
Gregory returned to England and rejoined Lewes on 7 September 2019.

Whitehawk
After a break from the game, Gregory signed for Whitehawk in November 2021, playing under Ross Standen, assistant manager from his Lewes days, before leaving at the end of the season.

References

External links

1992 births
Living people
Sportspeople from Eastbourne
English footballers
Association football defenders
Association football wingers
Association football utility players
Portsmouth F.C. players
Eastbourne Borough F.C. players
Lewes F.C. players
Whitehawk F.C. players
English Football League players
Isthmian League players
Nottingham Forest F.C. players
Ventura County Fusion players
USL League Two players
S.C. Beira-Mar players
Liga Portugal 2 players
English expatriate footballers
Expatriate soccer players in the United States
English expatriate sportspeople in the United States
Expatriate footballers in Portugal
English expatriate sportspeople in Portugal
National Premier Soccer League players